A Night in Tunisia is a live album by saxophonist Art Pepper recorded in California in 1977 by and originally released on the Japanese Trio label in 1983 as Volume 4 of the Art Pepper Memorial Collection before being rereleased on the Storyville label in 1988.

Reception

The AllMusic review by Scott Yanow noted "Since this was not one of Pepper's strongest groups, the LP is not essential, but fans of the unique altoist will want to pick up these interesting performances".

Track listing 
All compositions by Art Pepper except where noted.
 "Mr. Yohe" / "The Golden Gate Bridge" - 15:20
 "The Trip" / Introduction - 11:46
 "Lost Life" - 8:40
 "A Night in Tunisia" (Dizzy Gillespie, Frank Paparelli) - 11:31

Personnel 
Art Pepper - alto saxophone 
Smith Dobsen - piano
Jim Nichols - bass
Brad Bilhorn - drums

Back Cover

References 

Art Pepper live albums
1983 live albums
Storyville Records live albums